"Anybody (Movin' On)" is a song recorded by German band Masterboy and was released in September 1995, as the second single from their fourth album, Generation of Love. It achieved success in several countries, particularly in Finland, where it peaked at number 8, and in Austria, Belgium and France, where it peaked within the top-20. The song was also a top-30 hit in Germany, Sweden and Switzerland. On the Eurochart Hot 100, it reached a respectable number 37. Outside Europe, it was a huge hit in Israel, peaking at number 5.

Critical reception
Ross Jones from The Guardian wrote, "It's made in Germany, it's got a bouncy bassline, you can virtually smell the dry ice whooshing over its keyboards, and it asks you to "Shake your body to the groove" in a steely voice." Music Week rated the song three out of five, adding, "German house-poppers Masterboy hope to repeat their European successes in the Uk with this slice of infectious dancefloor fodder, though the Europop bubble does seem to have burst."

Music video
The music video for "Anybody (Movin' On)" was directed by German film director Gregor Schnitzler.

Track listings
 CD maxi  
 "Anybody (Movin' On)" (Friends Radio Edit) - 3:52
 "Anybody (Movin' On)" (Midnight Radio Edit) - 3:25
 "Anybody (Movin' On)" (Friends Mix) - 6:35
 "Anybody (Movin' On)" (Midnight Mix) - 5:30
 "Anybody (Movin' On)" (Midnight Mix-Rapless Version) - 5:30
 "Anybody (Movin' On)" (Instrumental) - 6:35
				
 CD maxi - Remixes
 "Anybody (Movin' On)" (Felix J. Gauder Radio RMX) - 4:07
 "Anybody (Movin' On)" (Felix J. Gauder Radio Rapless RMX) - 3:49
 "Anybody (Movin' On)" (Felix J. Gauder RMX) - 6:23
 "Anybody (Movin' On)" (La Casa Di Tokapi RMX) - 5:26
 "Anybody (Movin' On)" (Felix J. Gauder Rapless RMX) - 5:53
 "Anybody (Movin' On)" (Tokapi's Club Dub) - 5:20
 "Anybody (Movin' On)" (Neon Rave RMX)	- 5:08

Charts

References

1996 singles
1996 songs
Masterboy songs
Polydor Records singles